is a, Tongan-born, Japanese international rugby union player who plays as a Number 8.

References

1992 births
Living people
Japanese rugby union players
Tongan rugby union players
Japan international rugby union players
Tokyo Sungoliath players
Tongan expatriates in Japan
Sunwolves players
Rugby union number eights